The Amphibious Marine Brigade, also known as Amphibious Commando, is the marine corps unit of the Turkish Naval Forces based in Foça near İzmir, three amphibious battalions, an MBT battalion, an artillery battalion, a support battalion and other company-sized units.

History
The modern history of Turkish Marine Brigade, under the command of the Turkish Amphibious Group, began in 1966 with the formation of Amphibious Marine Infantry Brigade Command's first Amphibious Landing Forces, constituting the 1st Marine Infantry Battalion, was formed with Vice Admiral Kemal KAYACAN's encouragement on 15 September 1966 at the Garrison of Golcük. The Forces Headquarters was established in Mersin in April 1971. The 2nd Amphibious Marine Infantry Battalion was founded in 1973, and the headquarters of the Amphibious Marine Infantry Regiment was constituted on 18 April 1974, completed prior to the Invasion of Cyprus.

The Amphibious Marine Infantry Regiment operated on July 20, 1974, during intervention to Cyprus by sea, secured the beachhead and contributed to significant success. Amphibious Marine Infantry Division also participated in the Second Peace Operation, with the success of given tasks fulfilled. Due to the success in Cyprus Peace Operation, on November 15, 1983, Chief of the General Staff awarded the Gold "Outstanding courage and Self-sacrifice" medal.

After the invasion of Cyprus in 1974, the 3rd Naval Infantry Battalion, the Amphibious Support Battalion, was formed in 1979 in Izmir. This completed the organization of the unit at the regimental level. In 1980, the 3rd Amphibious Marine Infantry Battalion temporarily deployed to Mersin to complete martial law executive tasks. In the period 1985–1992 many domestic and overseas drills were conducted, the Aegean Sea and the Mediterranean deterrence tasks were performed successfully.

Gallery

See also
List of Turkish Commando Brigades

References

Turkey
Turkish Naval Forces
Military units and formations established in 1966
Special forces of Turkey